Puente Rodolfo Robles is a bridge  across the Suchiate River between Ciudad Hidalgo in the Mexican state of  Chiapas and Ciudad Tecún Umán in Guatemala. The bridge is named after Rodolfo Robles, the Guatemalan physician who first described "Robles disease" (0nchocerciasis).

See also 
 Guatemalan rail link with Mexico
 Mexican rail link with Guatemala
 Port Chiapas

References

International bridges
Guatemala–Mexico border crossings
Bridges in Mexico
Bridges in Guatemala
Buildings and structures in Chiapas
Transportation in Chiapas